Bacchisa cyanipennis is a species of beetle in the family Cerambycidae. It was described by Breuning in 1961. It is known from China.

References

C
Beetles described in 1961